The Madrid–Málaga high-speed rail line is a standard gauge High-speed rail line of  in length that links the city of Madrid with the city of Málaga in Spain. The line was inaugurated on 24 December 2007. At the time the service opened, Renfe Operadora was running 22 trains daily between Madrid and Málaga.

History
The first high-speed rail line in Spain was opened in 1992 when Madrid–Seville high-speed rail line was inaugurated as a part of the NAFA project (Nuevo Acceso Ferroviario a Andalucía, New Rail Access to Andalusia). In January 1993 the Talgo 200 Madrid–Málaga service began, using AVE lines as far as Córdoba and then Spanish-gauge conventional track to reach Málaga. The new high-speed section from Córdoba to Málaga, which is considered as a part of the New Rail Access to Andalusia, was projected in 1999 and integrated into the PEIT (Strategic Infrastructure Plan of the Ministry of Development, 2005-2020) with an estimated investment of €2.1 billion. Construction and operation were entrusted to Adif. The first  of the new section between Córdoba and Antequera-Santa Ana was put in service on 16 December 2006. The line was completed on 23 December 2007 reaching the city of Málaga and the new station Málaga María Zambrano.

Line
It connects the cities of Madrid, Córdoba and Málaga, and also includes stops at Puente Genil and Antequera in Andalusia, Spain that are served by the AVANT service. For the part between Madrid and Córdoba the line shares a common section with the Madrid–Seville high-speed rail line inaugurated in 1992. Outside Córdoba a  spur railway branches off towards Málaga (the total distance between Córdoba and Málaga on the line is ).

Route
The stations along the line are Madrid Atocha railway station, Córdoba Central, Puente Genil-Herrera, Antequera-Santa Ana and Málaga María Zambrano.

The line runs along a double track section in the few kilometres after Córdoba Central and later becomes quadruple track. Eventually, just outside a town called Los Mochos (a few kilometres east-north-east of Almodóvar del Río), the Seville and Málaga branches become separate. The line takes a different route to the existing slower single-track line, but starts to run parallel to it between the towns of Doñana and Santa Rosalia Maqueda, running alongside it for the rest of the journey to Málaga-María Zambrano station.

The precipitous terrain is one possible reason why the Córdoba–Seville section was opened in 1992, but the Córdoba–Málaga section wasn't opened until December 2007.

Services
The AVE service (using the AVE Class 102) offers Madrid–Málaga journey times of 2 hours and 20 minutes with direct services.

Direct Barcelona–Málaga AVE services are also offered by combining the Madrid-Málaga line and Madrid–Barcelona high-speed rail line on the same route. S-112 (Pato, max speed ) trains are used for these services and cover the distance between Barcelona and Málaga in 5 hours and 50 minutes without making a stop in Madrid but with additional intermediate stops at Camp de Tarragona, Lleida Pirineus and Zaragoza-Delicias.

The AVANT services transport passengers directly from Seville to Málaga and vice versa, with intermediate stops at Puente Genil-Herrera and Antequera-Santa Ana stations between Córdoba and Málaga.

See also 
 High-speed rail in Spain
 Madrid–Seville high-speed rail line
 Madrid–Barcelona high-speed rail line
 AVE Class 103
 AVE
 Córdoba, Spain
 Málaga

References

External links 
 
  
 

High-speed railway lines in Spain
Málaga
Province of Córdoba (Spain)
Railway lines opened in 2007
Standard gauge railways in Spain
2007 establishments in Spain